Pseudonebularia rueppellii is a species of sea snail, a marine gastropod mollusk in the family Mitridae, the miters or miter snails. It has a usually brown and/or white shell. The shell has swirls that come up to make a pointed/cone shape for the shell.

Distribution

References

Mitridae
Gastropods described in 1844